Pero Sudar (born 3 July 1951) was an auxiliary bishop of Vrhbosna in Bosnia and Herzegovina.

Priesthood 

Sudar was ordained priest of the Archdiocese of Vrhbosna on June 29, 1977. In 1977 he served as parochial vicar at Church of the Assumption of the Blessed Virgin Mary in Komušina near Teslić in Bosnia and Herzegovina. After that, he went to Rome where he received a doctorate in canon law at Pontifical Urbaniana University. After returning from Rome, he taught canon law at Vrhbosnian Theology and from 1989 to 1993 he held the office of Chancellor of The Archdiocesan Seminary in Sarajevo.

Episcopal career 

On May 28, 1993, Sudar was appointed auxiliary bishop of Vrhbosna and titular bishop of Selia by Pope John Paul II. He received his episcopal consecration on January 6, 1994 from Vinko Cardinal Puljić, with Franjo Cardinal Kuharić and Bishop Ćiril Kos serving as co-consecrators. He selected as his episcopal motto: "Mir vama". On October 18th 2019, Pope Francis  accepted Sudar's resignation.

References

External links 

1951 births
Living people
People from Konjic
Roman Catholic Archdiocese of Vrhbosna
21st-century Roman Catholic titular bishops
Bishops appointed by Pope John Paul II
20th-century Roman Catholic bishops in Bosnia and Herzegovina
21st-century Roman Catholic bishops in Bosnia and Herzegovina
Croats of Bosnia and Herzegovina
20th-century Roman Catholic titular bishops